Friedrich Karl Emanuel Hauke (born Johann Friedrich Michael Hauck; ; 4 October 173718 June 1810) was the son of Ignatius Hauke (1705–1784) and Maria Franziska (1718–1785), a daughter of Baron Georg Riedesel zu Eisenbach. Friedrich is a direct ancestor of the British, Spanish and the Swedish royal families. Three of his sons were elevated to the rank of count within Poland–Lithuania and the Holy Roman Empire.

Career 
Friedrich's brother, Peter Anton, was a canon at the Mainz Cathedral. From a young age, Friedrich worked as a secretary to the family of the Counts of Brühl, living alternately in Seifersdorf, in Saxony, and Warsaw. In 1782, Hauke and his siblings changed their family name from Hauck to the more phonetic Hauke. In 1785 Count Alois Friedrich von Brühl moved permanently to Saxony, while the Haukes, whose children became attached to Warsaw, remained in Poland. Friedrich first taught at the Crown Artillery School, then he ran an exclusive private school for boys, attended by the sons of the rich nobility. In 1807 he accepted the post of Professor of German and Mathematics at the Warsaw Lyceum, where he remained until his death.

Marriage 
In 1773, Hauke married Maria Salomé Schweppenhäuser (1751–1833). Among their children include General Johann Moritz Hauke, father of Julia, Princess of Battenberg (1825–1895). Through Julia, Friedrich is a direct ancestor of the British, Spanish and the Swedish royal families. Friedrich and Maria Salomé's issue:
 Christina Frederica (1774–1823), married General Józef Hurtig.
 John Maurice (1775–1830), General and Polish count, father of Julia von Hauke.
 Caroline Louise (1777–1858), married Karol Lessel, a confectioner from Warsaw.
 Louis Augustus (1779–1851), Councilor of State during Congress Poland, father of General .
 Amelia (1783–1875), never married.
 Christiane (1785–1803), never married, drowned in Vistula.
 Joseph Henry (1790–1837), General and Polish count, father of Józef Hauke-Bosak.

References 

Battenberg family
Polish educational theorists
Burials at Powązki Cemetery
1737 births
1810 deaths